The NCAA Season 97 seniors' basketball tournament was the basketball tournaments of the National Collegiate Athletic Association (Philippines) for its 2021–22 season. This was the first tournament since the COVID-19 pandemic in the Philippines, and since 2019 after the planned 96th season was cancelled because of the pandemic. Only the seniors' tournament for college students shall be held; the juniors' tournament for senior high school students last held in 2019 was still not held.

The Letran Knights won all games to become champions undefeated, defeating the Mapua Cardinals in the finals. Rhenz Abando was named season MVP.

Tournament format 
The season will be held with five gamedays a week calendar, with two games being played in each gameday. These gamedays are scheduled from Tuesday to Sundays.

 Round robin tournament
 Teams will be ranked by winning percentage.
 Top two teams will be given the twice-to-beat advantage in the semifinals. Next four teams will participate in the play-in tournament.
 Third and fourth placed teams will play for the third seed
 Fifth and sixth placed teams will play for a berth in the fourth seed playoff, to face the loser of the third seed playoff.
 The finals shall be a best-of-three series.

Teams 
All ten schools are participating.

Coaching changes

Venues 

St. Benilde Gym in La Salle Green Hills (LSGH), Mandaluyong is the exclusive venue of the tournament. All games will be held behind closed doors, with teams being transported to LSGH from their schools every game day.

In April, the NCAA announced that fans will be allowed back to watch the games at the venue for the last game day of the elimination round, the play-in tournament, semifinals, and finals, which was held at the Filoil Flying V Centre in San Juan.

Squads 
Each NCAA team can have up to 15 players on their roster.

Starting this season, all teams in all sports are banned from including foreigners in their rosters. Squads were released on March 22.

Elimination round

Team standings

Match-up results

Scores
Results on top and to the right of the dashes are for first-round games.

Play-in tournament

Third seed playoff 
This is between the teams that finished 3rd and 4th after the elimination round; the winner is the #3 seed and advances to the semifinals against the #2 seed, while the loser is relegated to the fourth seed playoff.

Qualifying playoff 
This is between the teams that finished 5th and 6th after the elimination round; the winner advances to the fourth seed playoff, while the loser is eliminated.

Fourth seed playoff 
The winner is the #4 seed and advances to the semifinals against the #1 seed.

Bracket 

Game went into overtime

Semifinals 
The top 2 seeded teams have the twice-to-beat advantage. In case a team wins all elimination round games, the stepladder format won't be used since the elimination round is shortened to just one round instead of the usual two.

Letran vs. Perpetual
This is the first meeting between Letran and Perpetual in the playoffs. Letran qualified to its third consecutive playoffs, while Perpetual returned to the playoffs after missing out the 2019 tournament.

Mapúa vs. San Beda
This is the first meeting between Mapúa and San Beda in the semifinals since 2008 and fourth overall. Meanwhile, this is Mapúa's first semifinals appearance since 2016 and the first time they have the twice-to-beat advantage. while it will be the first time since 2005 when San Beda does not have the twice-to-beat advantage.

Finals 
The finals is a best-of-three series. This is the first meeting between Letran and Mapúa in the finals during the Final Four era, the second since 1979 where Letran won the title, and is a part of the Battle of Intramuros rivalry, so named after the district of Manila both schools are located at. Letran is in its second consecutive finals appearance, while Mapúa is in its first finals appearance since 1995.

 Finals Most Valuable Player: 
 Coach of the Year:

All-Star Game 
An all-star game pattered after the NBA All-Star Game was held after the tournament. It included 2 teams, "Team Saints" or the schools named after Catholic saints and figures, and "Team Heroes", for those named after Filipino dignitaries and heroes. Each team has two all-stars from each school, and several male contract stars of Sparkle, GMA's talent agency.

 All-Star Game MVP: Enoch Valdez (Team Heroes)
 Celebrity MVP: Jose Sarasola (Team Saints)

Awards 

The awards were given prior to Game 2 of the seniors' Finals.
Most Valuable Player: 
Rookie of the Year: 
Mythical Five:
 
 
 
 
 
Defensive Player of the Year: 
All-Defensive Team:

 

Most Improved Player: 
Sportsmanship Award: Perpetual Altas

Statistical leaders

Game player highs

Season player highs 
This were for games played during the elimination round.

See also 
 UAAP Season 84 basketball tournaments

References

External links 

 gmanetwork.com/ncaa GMA coverage website

 

97
Basketball events postponed due to the COVID-19 pandemic
2021–22 in Philippine college basketball